In law, banned is a state resulting from a legal prohibition.

Banned  or The Banned may also refer to:

Banned (EP), an album by UGK
Banned, a horse in Jefferson Cup Stakes
The Banned, New Wave band
The Banned (EastEnders), fictional band

See also